Badri  is a 2000 Indian Telugu-language romantic action film written and directed by Puri Jagannadh. It stars Pawan Kalyan, Amisha Patel and Renu Desai, with music composed by Ramana Gogula. It is produced by T. Trivikrama Rao under the Vijaya Lakhshmi Movies banner. The film marks the debut of Puri Jagannadh as a director and Ramana Gogula's collaboration with Pawan Kalyan after the successful film Thammudu (1999). In 2004, Puri Jagannadh remade this film in Hindi as Shart: The Challenge.

Plot
Badri (Pawan Kalyan) is an ad agency director whose parents are settled in the USA. His girlfriend, Vennela (Renu Desai), is a close friend of Badri's family. Their parents want these two to tie the knot. Badri and Vennela are whiling away time, as Vennela did not finish her graduation yet.

On one of those romantic evenings, Vennela tells Badri that she loves him very much. But, at the same time, she does not find the same sincerity in Badri's love. She challenges him: No other girl on earth would probably love him more than she does. Badri, who gets carried away in arguments, takes up the challenge immediately. Vennela shows a beautiful girl (Amisha Patel) coming out of the temple and asks him to approach that girl. Then Vennela goes to the US to spend time with Badri's parents. Badri gets the info of the new girl in no time and finds out that her name is Sarayu. She is a pampered-yet-docile sister of Nanda (Prakash Raj). After a few tries he is able to corner Sarayu to the extent that she expresses her love and puts forward a marriage proposal, to which Badri gives no response.

Meantime, Vennela is back and can see the chemistry between Sarayu and Badri. She starts regretting the bet with Badri. Badri, too, is torn. Nanda, who is excessively fond and protective of his sister Sarayu, guns for the blood of Badri, as he knows that Badri and Vennela are destined for marriage.

Cast

Pawan Kalyan as Badhrinath / Badri
Amisha Patel as Sarayu
Renu Desai as Vennela 
Prakash Raj as Nanda
Kota Srinivasa Rao  as Badri's father
Brahmanandam as Gangaraju
Ali 
Kaushal Manda
Mallikarjuna Rao as Manikantha 
M. S. Narayana as C. M. / Chandra Mouli 
Sangeetha as Badri's mother 
Rama Prabha as Vennela's grandmother
Uttej
Narsing Yadav
Ironleg Sastri
Tirupathi Prakash

Soundtrack

Music composed by Ramana Gogula. It was a success. Music released on Aditya Music Company. "Ye Chiquita" became a chartbuster and was on top of the charts almost for a year.

References

External links 

2000 films
Films directed by Puri Jagannadh
Telugu films remade in other languages
2000s Telugu-language films
Indian romantic comedy films
2000 directorial debut films
2000 romantic comedy films